William Reginald Wallace Mackey (May 7, 1899 – February 26, 1966) was a Canadian professional ice hockey defenceman who played one season in the National Hockey League for the New York Rangers, in 1926–27. Previously he also played for the Calgary Tigers and Vancouver Maroons in the Western Canada Hockey League.

He was born in North Gower, Ontario.

References

External links

1899 births
1966 deaths
Calgary Tigers players
Canadian ice hockey defencemen
Ice hockey people from Ottawa
New York Rangers players
Vancouver Maroons players